Sergio Valdez (born September 7, 1964 in Elias Piña, Dominican Republic) is a former professional baseball pitcher in Major League Baseball who played from  through  with the Montreal Expos (1986, 1992–93), the Atlanta Braves (1989–90), the Cleveland Indians (1991–92), the Boston Red Sox (1994), and San Francisco Giants (1995).

Career
On September 10, 1986, Valdez made his major league debut against the New York Mets giving up five earned runs and nine hits through six innings to record his first major league loss. In 1986, he started five games and lost four of them.

He returned to the majors after leaving in 1989 as a reliever, starting just one in 19 appearances, and earning a 6.06 ERA with a 1-2 record.

He was selected off waivers from the Braves by the Indians on April 30, 1990. The Indians used him as a starter and reliever (13 of 24 appearances with the Indians were starts) and overall that year he went 6-6 with a 4.85 ERA.

He had his best year in 1992, when he went 0-2 with a 2.41 ERA. His WHIP was a microscopic 0.991. However, in 1993 he only pitched three innings.

The Giants used Valdez as a starter once again, despite his having been used as a reliever throughout most of his career. He went 4-5 with a 4.75 ERA.

References

External links

1964 births
Living people
Atlanta Braves players
Boston Red Sox players
Calgary Expos players
Cleveland Indians players
Colorado Springs Sky Sox players
Dominican Republic expatriate baseball players in Canada
Dominican Republic expatriate baseball players in the United States
Indianapolis Indians players
Jamestown Expos players

Major League Baseball pitchers
Major League Baseball players from the Dominican Republic
Montreal Expos players
Ottawa Lynx players
Pawtucket Red Sox players
People from Elías Piña Province
Phoenix Firebirds players
San Francisco Giants players
Sarasota Red Sox players
Utica Blue Sox players
West Palm Beach Expos players